Matthias H. Tschöp (born April 7, 1967) is a German physician and scientist. He is the chief executive officer and scientific director of Helmholtz Zentrum München, German Research Center for Environmental Health. He is also Alexander von Humboldt Professor and Chair of Metabolic Diseases at Technical University of Munich and serves as an adjunct professor at Yale University.

Career and research 
Tschöp obtained an M.D. from the Ludwig Maximilian University of Munich (1993), where he worked as a clinician (1994–1998) in neuroendocrinology before accepting a research fellowship at the Eli Lilly Discovery Research Laboratories (1999–2002) and leading a research team at the German Institute of Human Nutrition (Potsdam/Nuthetal 2002–2003). He served as a Professor of Endocrinology and Diabetes at the Metabolic Diseases Institute of the University of Cincinnati (2003–2009), before being named the Arthur Russell Morgan Endowed Chair of Medicine, and Research Director of the Metabolism Center of Excellence for Diabetes and Obesity at the University of Cincinnati (2009–2011). He was Research Director of the Helmholtz Diabetes Center and Director of the Institute for Diabetes and Obesity at Helmholtz Zentrum München (2011–2018). 

Early in his career, Tschöp reported on the orexigenic, adipogenic, and metabolic effects of ghrelin and its secretory control by nutrients, which has had a major influence on human obesity and diabetes research. His corresponding publication in Nature is among today's most frequently cited metabolism research papers. It added a fundamental pathway to the current model of body weight and glucose control and established novel drug targets for metabolic diseases. Tschöp went on to further dissect gut-brain communication pathways, based on GI-hormone signaling and lessons from unraveling the molecular underpinnings of gastric bypass surgery.

Together with his close collaborator Richard DiMarchi (Indiana University) he discovered and validated novel gut hormone co-agonist peptides, which simultaneously target several neuroendocrine receptors and efficiently reduce body weight and improve glucose tolerance. Several of these compounds are now in clinical trials for the treatment of diabetes and obesity. Tschöp and DiMarchi more recently went on to discover and validate another class of drug candidates by engineering peptide to deliver steroid/small molecules to selected cell populations.

In 2022, Tschöp was a candidate to succeed Heinz Engl as rector of the University of Vienna; however, he ultimately withdrew his application.

Other activities 
 Cell, Member of the Advisory Board (since 2020)
 Institute of Metabolism and Systems Research (IMSR), University of Birmingham, Member of the Scientific Advisory Board

Awards and recognition 
 2022: European Association for the Study of Diabetes (EASD)-Lilly Centennial Anniversary Prize
 2022: Member of the Association of American Physicians
 2021: Ernst Jung Prize for Medicine
 2021: Berthold Medal of the German Society for Endocrinology
 2020: Member of the European Molecular Biology Organization (EMBO) 
 2019: C. Ronald Kahn Distinguished Lectureship 2019–2020, Joslin Diabetes Center
 2019: Paul Langerhans Medal
 2018: Carus Prize, City of Schweinfurt
 2018: Ordinary member of the Bavarian Academy of Sciences and Humanities
 2017: Carus Medal, Academy of Sciences Leopoldina
 2017: Charles H. Best Lectureship and Award, University of Toronto
 2017: Hansen Family Award, Bayer Foundations
 2017: Honorary doctorate degree (Dr. h.c.), University of Leipzig
 2017: Rolf Sammet Professorship, Frankfurt University
 2017: Outstanding Innovation Award, Endocrine Society
 2017: Geoffrey Harris Prize
 2016: The Victor Mutt Award 
 2016: European Medal of the Society for Endocrinology
 2016: Elected Member, Academia Europaea 
 2016: ERC Advanced Grant
 2014: Erwin Schrödinger Prize, Stifterverband Science Award – Erwin Schrödinger Prize
 2014: Paul Martini Prize, Paul Martini Foundation
 2014: Linda and Jack Gill Distinguished Scientist Award, Linda and Jack Gill Center for Biomolecular Science at Indiana University
 2013: Elected Member, German National Academy of Sciences Leopoldina
 2012: Werner-Creutzfeld-Award, German Diabetes Society
 2012: Alexander von Humboldt Professorship, Alexander von Humboldt Foundation
 2011: Outstanding Scientific Achievement Award, American Diabetes Association
 2010: NIH/NIDDK 60th Anniversary Scholar Award 
 2010: André Mayer Award, Int. Association for the Study of Obesity, IASO
 2009: Elected Member, The American Society for Clinical Investigation, ASCI
 2007: Scientific Achievement Award, The Obesity Society, TOS/NAASO 
 2007: Christina Barz Award of the German Society for Psychiatry, Neurology and Psychosomatic Medicine
 2002: Young Investigator Award, European Neuroendocrine Association, ENEA
 2001: Schoeller-Junkmann Award of the German Endocrine Society, DGE
 2000: Lilly Research Laboratories President's Award  
 2000: Eli Lilly Endocrine Research Award for Science

References

External links 
 
 Prof. Matthias Tschöp, Chair of Metabolic Diseases, TUM School of Medicine

1967 births
Living people
21st-century German scientists
Members of the German Academy of Sciences Leopoldina
Members of Academia Europaea
Members of the Bavarian Academy of Sciences